Burak Süleyman (born 1 September 1994) is a Turkish professional footballer who plays as a winger for Turkish club Sakaryaspor.

Career
Süleyman signed his first contract with Göztepe, after spending most of his early career in amateur leagues with Kocaelispor. Süleyman made his professional debut with Göztepe in a 1-1 Süper Lig tie with BB Erzurumspor on 7 November 2020.

References

External links

1994 births
Sportspeople from İzmit
Living people
Turkish footballers
Association football wingers
Gölcükspor footballers
Kocaelispor footballers
Göztepe S.K. footballers
Bandırmaspor footballers
Sakaryaspor footballers
Süper Lig players
TFF First League players
TFF Second League players
TFF Third League players